UNMC may refer to:

United Nations Millennium Campaign, a UNDP campaign unit working on issues related Millennium Development Goals
Universalist National Memorial Church, the headquarters of the Universalist Church of America
University of Nebraska Medical Center
University of Nottingham Malaysia Campus
 United Nations Memorial Cemetery, in Busan, South Korea